John Lindgren may refer to:
John Lindgren (1899–1990), Swedish Olympic cross country skier
John R. Lindgren (1855–1915), American banking executive

See also
Johan Lindgren (born 1986), Swedish professional road bicycle racer
Johan Lundgren (1899–1979), Danish cyclist
Johan Lundgren (businessman) (born 1966), Swedish businessman
John Lundgren (disambiguation)
Jon Lindgren (born 1938), mayor of Fargo, North Dakota and LGBT advocate
Lindgren